Sisymbrella is a genus of flowering plants belonging to the family Brassicaceae.

Its native range is Western and Central Mediterranean.

Species:

Sisymbrella aspera 
Sisymbrella dentata

References

Brassicaceae
Brassicaceae genera